Kevin O'Connor (1923 - 18 October 2004) was an Irish hurler who played as a right wing-forward for the Waterford senior team.

Born in Waterford, O'Connor first played competitive hurling in his youth. He subsequently became a regular member of the starting fifteen of the Waterford senior team and won one All-Ireland medal and one Munster medal.

At club level O'Connor was a three-time championship medallist with Erin's Own.

Honours

Team

Erin's Own
Waterford Senior Hurling Championship (1): 1942, 1946, 1947

Waterford
All-Ireland Senior Hurling Championship (1): 1948
Munster Senior Hurling Championship (1): 1948

References

1923 births
2004 deaths
Erin's Own (Waterford) hurlers
Waterford inter-county hurlers
All-Ireland Senior Hurling Championship winners